The Great Philosophers is a 1987 BBC television series presented by Bryan Magee. There were 15 episodes, in each of which Magee interviewed a noted philosopher.

Overview
In this series, Magee discussed the major historical figures of Western philosophy with fifteen contemporary philosophers. The series covered the philosophies of Plato, Aristotle, and Descartes, among others, ending with a discussion with John Searle on the philosophy of Wittgenstein. Extensively revised versions of the dialogues of The Great Philosophers are available in a book of the same name. DVDs of, and streaming rights to, the series are sold to academic institutions and episodes are available to stream to those with access to the Alexander Street academic database. Neither this series, nor Magee's 1978 series Men of Ideas, are commercially available to home users but most of the episodes from both are freely available on YouTube.  The theme played over the opening credits comes from the third movement of Symphony No. 8 (Shostakovich).

Guests
 Myles Burnyeat on Plato
 Martha Nussbaum on Aristotle
 Anthony Kenny on Medieval Philosophy
 Bernard Williams on Descartes
 Anthony Quinton on Spinoza and Leibniz
 Michael R. Ayers on Locke and Berkeley
 John Passmore on Hume
 Geoffrey Warnock on Kant
 Peter Singer on Hegel and Marx
 Frederick Copleston on Schopenhauer
 J. P. Stern on Nietzsche
 Hubert Dreyfus on Husserl, Heidegger and Modern Existentialism
 Sidney Morgenbesser on The American Pragmatists
 A. J. Ayer on Frege, Russell and Modern Logic
 John Searle on Wittgenstein

See also
 Men of Ideas, a similar BBC television series presented by Magee in 1978

References

External links
 
 Audio (MP3) files of interviews

1987 British television series debuts
1987 British television series endings
BBC Television shows
Philosophy television series